Edouard Charles "Rolla" Norman (1889–1971) was a French stage and film actor.

Selected filmography
 The Assassination of the Duke of Guise (1908)
 The Advocate (1925)
 The Last Fort (1928)
 The Vein (1928)
 The Great Passion (1928)
 Counter Investigation (1930)
 The Yellow Dog (1932)
 Antoinette (1932)
 A Star Disappears (1932)
 The House of Mystery (1933)
 Cease Firing (1934)
 The Mysteries of Paris (1935)
 The Two Boys (1936)
 The Porter from Maxim's (1939)
 Notre-Dame de la Mouise (1941)

External links

1889 births
1971 deaths
French male film actors
French male silent film actors
Male actors from Paris
20th-century French male actors